Carr v News Group Newspapers Ltd [2005] EWHC 971 is an English legal case in which Maxine Carr was awarded a lifelong injunction preventing publication of her new identity.  Carr provided a false alibi to Ian Huntley who was convicted of the Soham murders.

References

English privacy case law